Jenna Rose Swerdlow (born ), best known as Jenna Rose, is an American pop singer who gained media attention with her single "My Jeans". After the video became popular on YouTube and received 14 million views, Swerdlow is considered a semi-"viral star".

Background
Swerdlow was born , on Long Island, New York. She is an only child. She spent her early life in Baldwin, New York and relocated with her family to Dix Hills, New York in 2005.
She began performing at age 2, and received private vocal training at age 8. Starting with community theater and moving on to regional productions and Off-Broadway, she has performed in over 18 plays, including principal roles in Ragtime and The Miracle Worker, as well as the title role in the 2011 Off-Broadway play, The Odella Williams Show. She was a finalist in Got Talent?, a Long Island talent competition, as well as the New York Knicks Kids Talent Search. It was reported by Fox WNYW that by March 2011, her videos had had over 1 million "hits", she had recorded six songs, and she had performed at a Knicks game halftime show.

Music
In August 2009, it was reported that Swerdlow and nineteen other musicians were selected for individual coaching and recording sessions by long-time Billy Joel sax player Richie Cannata, and Jenna wrote on her Facebook page that Richie's son Eren Cannata wrote and produced three singles for her, "Sweet Melody", "The Remedy", and "Spotlight". Since then, Swerdlow has collaborated with different songwriters, producers and choreographers, to record songs and music videos.

At age twelve, while she was in seventh grade at West Hollow Middle School, Swerdlow released her first music video, My Jeans, featuring a rap by Baby Triggy, on YouTube in October 2010; locations included the Deer Park Tanger Outlet. The video went viral, garnering over a million views and bring Swerdlow media attention. "My Jeans" was panned by YouTube viewers, earning her, as of September 8, 2011, 26,355 "likes" and 295,189 "dislikes" for the video. Detractors found fault not only with Swerdlow's song, but with her clothes, the shape of her mouth, and the video's production values. The video continues to be popular, with the original video reaching over 14 million views as of early September 2011, even though it has "spawned parodies, video responses, rap replies and more than a dozen pages of written critiques."

Despite negative reviews of "My Jeans", Swerdlow followed up with "O.M.G." in March 2011, and "Don't Give Up", in April 2011. Swerdlow and her parents describe the song "O.M.G." as a response to online criticism and cyberbullying. Though covered by media, these subsequent songs received less interest than her original viral video; both display similar negative ratings, and have been panned by critics. "O.M.G." received "more than a million views" as of May 2011. The lyrics were described as "disturbing" for a 12-year-old singer. On PerezHilton.com the video was described as "hyper-sexualized, uber-creepy and if you really want to talk about jacking swag, not one dance move wasn't pulled from another video circa 1998." In October 2012, Swerdlow debuted her version of "Walk On By", toured with two other groups and performed at Nassau Coliseum.

Rose was a drummer in her high school band. She graduated from college with a degree in music.

Recognition and followup
In February 2009, the town board of Huntington, New York, recognized Swerdlow "for her contributions to the performing arts community". Subsequent to the release of "My Jeans" Swerdlow has been interviewed by news networks, covered in news items, and has performed live in concert at the Westbury Music Fair.

In March 2011, Time magazine listed Swerdlow as one of "three kids who may be next to gain viral fame" similar to Rebecca Black. Writers have made comparisons between Swerdlow and Black, since both teens have produced videos that fall into the same genre of bubblegum pop, are "slammed by critics as being too provocative", and both have received harsh feedback from the public. Her videos have inspired remixes, slowdown/speedups, commentary, lip-sync, and analysis on YouTube.
In 2012, Swerdlow's online presence was hacked; her Twitter account, YouTube channel and AOL address were defaced with "Nazi swastikas and obscenities." Prior to the attack, her YouTube channel had accumulated a total of 25 million views.

Discography

Singles

Filmography

See also

References

External links 

 
 

1998 births
Year of birth missing (living people)
Living people
21st-century American singers
American child actresses
American child singers
Child pop musicians
People from Baldwin, Nassau County, New York
People from Dix Hills, New York
People from Long Island
Singers from New York (state)
Viral videos
21st-century American women